The following is a list of notable deaths in December 1997.

Entries for each day are listed alphabetically by surname. A typical entry lists information in the following sequence:
 Name, age, country of citizenship at birth, subsequent country of citizenship (if applicable), reason for notability, cause of death (if known), and reference.

December 1997

1
Julius Barnathan, 70, American broadcast engineer, lung cancer.
Stéphane Grappelli, 89, French-Italian jazz violinist.
Władysław Młynek, 67, Polish teacher, writer and poet.
Jiří Pleskot, 75, Czech actor.
Khan Ataur Rahman, 68, Bangladeshi film actor, director, and singer.
Edwin Rosario, 34, Puerto Rican boxer, aneurysm.

2
Guido Brunner, 67, Spanish-German diplomat and politician.
Silvio Ceccato, 83, Italian philosopher and linguist.
Shirley Crabtree, 67, British wrestler known as Big Daddy, stroke.
Harald Gelhaus, 82, German U-boat commander during World War II.
Robert A. Hall, 86, American linguist.
Steve Hamilton, 63, American basketball player, colon cancer.
Michael Hedges, 43, American composer, guitarist and singer-songwriter, car accident.
Marge Kotlisky, 70, American actress (Major League, Thief, Sixteen Candles).
Endicott Peabody, 77, American gridiron football player and politician, leukemia.

3
Stan Anderson, 58, Scottish football player.
Domenico Enrici, 88, Italian prelate of the Catholic Church.
Benito Jacovitti, 74, Italian comic artist.
Vic Lombardi, 75, American Major League Baseball player.
Olaf Pedersen, 77, Danish historian of science.

4
Leo August, 83, American philatelist.
Morton Bard, 73, American psychologist and author of The Crime Victim's Book.
Buck Barry, 80, American actor and radio and television personality.
Joe Brown, 71, American boxer.
Ho Sin Hang, 97, Hong Kong entrepreneur and philanthropist.
G. S. Jayanath, Sri Lanka Army officer, killed in action.
Vytautas Kazimieras Jonynas, 90, Lithuanian artist.
Alberto Manzi, 73, Italian school teacher, writer and television host.
K. A. Nizami, 71, Indian historian and diplomat.
Richard Vernon, 72, English actor (Goldfinger, Gandhi, The Man in Room 17), complications from Parkinson's disease.
Joseph Wolpe, 82, South African psychiatrist.

5
Rudolf Bahro, 62, East Germany dissident and politician, cancer.
Forrest Burmeister, 84, American gridiron football player.
Eugen Cicero, 57, Romanian-German jazz pianist.
Frederick Dainton, Baron Dainton, 83, British academic chemist.
Ali Forney, 22, American gay and transgender youth, murdered.
Lutz Hoffmann, 38, East German gymnast and Olympic silver medalist, suicide.
John E. Moss, 82, American politician.
Jakob Sverdrup, 78, Norwegian historian.
Jan Voigt, 69, Norwegian actor, dancer and museum director.

6
George Chisholm, 82, Scottish jazz trombonist and vocalist.
Lou Clinton, 60, American baseball player, pneumonia.
Eliot Daniel, 89, American songwriter and lyricist.
Gilbert Delahaye, 74, Belgian author (Martine).
Willy den Ouden, 79, Dutch swimmer and Olympic champion.
Jagmohan Kaur, 49, Indian singer and actress.
Peter Leventritt, 82, American bridge player.
Eddie Myers, 91, British Army officer and author.
Willie Pastrano, 62, American boxer, liver cancer.

7
Billy Bremner, 54, Scottish footballer and manager, suspected heart attack.
Barry S. Brook, 81, American musicologist.
Félix Candela, 87, Spanish architect.
Torbjörn Caspersson, 87, Swedish cytologist and geneticist.
Fernand Cornez, 90, French road bicycle racer.
Karl August Folkers, 91, American biochemist.
George R. Gardiner, 80, Canadian businessman and philanthropist.
Annette B. Weiner, 64, American anthropologist.
Woodrow Wyatt, 79, British politician, author and journalist.

8
Bob Bell, 75, American actor famous for his alter-ego, Bozo the Clown.
Walter Molino, 82, Italian comics artist and illustrator.
Léon Poliakov, 87, French historian.
Carlos Rafael Rodríguez, 84, Cuban communist politician, Parkinson's disease.
Laurean Rugambwa, 85, Tanzanian cardinal of the Roman Catholic Church.
Stephen Tredre, 34, English actor and writer, bone cancer.
Armando Valente, 94, Italian track and field athlete and Olympian.
Shehu Musa Yar'Adua, 54, Nigerian army general, politician and Vice President.

9
Tamara Geva, 91, Russian-American actress, ballet dancer, and choreographer.
Angelo Herndon, 84, American labor organizer.
K. Shivaram Karanth, 95, Indian polymath.
Michael Lee Lockhart, 37, American convicted serial killer, execution by lethal injection.
Keith W. Piper, 76, American football coach, congestive heart failure.
Stefano Ludovico Straneo, 95, Italian entomologist and author.
John D. Winters, 80, American historian.

10
Anatoliy Banishevskiy, 51, Azerbaijani football playerer, diabetic coma attack.
Kalmen Kaplansky, 85, Canadian human rights and trade union activist.
Yevgeni Mayorov, 59, Soviet ice hockey player, A.L.S.
Eve McVeagh, 78, American actress (High Noon, The Clear Horizon, The Glass Web).

11
Roger Brown, 72, American social psychologist.
Eddie Chapman, 83, English criminal and spy during World War II.
Robert Cosmoc, 66, Romanian footballer.
Jorge Castañeda y Álvarez de la Rosa, 76, Mexican diplomat.
Simon Jeffes, 48, English classical guitarist, composer and arranger, brain tumor, brain cancer.
Paul Scull, 90, American football player.

12
R. Stanton Avery, 90, American inventor.
Wacław Gajewski, 86, Polish geneticist.
Brian Deneke, 19, American punk musician, murdered.
Evgenii Landis, 76, Soviet and Russian mathematician.
M. G. Soman, 53, Indian Air Force officer and actor.

13
Giovanni Alberto Agnelli, 33, Italian businessman and member of the Agnelli family, stomach cancer.
Martin Carter, 70, Guyanese poet and political activist.
Paddy DeMarco, 69, American lightweight boxer.
Don Edward Fehrenbacher, 77, American historian and Pullitzer Prize winner.
Harry Glaß, 67, East German ski jumper and Olympian.
Jimmy Milne, 86, Scottish football player and manager.
W. D. Mochtar, 69, Indonesian actor.
David Nicholson, 93, Australian politician.
Alexander Oppenheim, 94, British mathematician.
David Rousset, 85, French writer and political activist.
Claude Roy, 82, French poet and essayist, cancer.

14
John Adair, 84, American anthropologist.
Owen Barfield, 99, British philosopher, author, critic, and member of the Inklings.
Frank Baumholtz, 79, American baseball and basketball player.
Marion Bell, 78, American singer and musical theatre performer.
Gerald Legge, 9th Earl of Dartmouth, 73, British peer and businessman.
Stubby Kaye, 79, American actor (Guys and Dolls, Who Framed Roger Rabbit, Cat Ballou), comedian and singer, lung cancer.
Edna F. Kelly, 91, American politician.
Emily Cheney Neville, 77, American author.
Torsten Nilsson, 92, American politician.
Kurt Winter, 51, Canadian guitarist and songwriter, kidney failure.

15
Karsten Andersen, 77, Norwegian conductor.
Cosmo Campoli, 74, American sculptor.
Siegfried Flügge, 85, German theoretical physicist.
Albert Heremans, 91, Belgian football player.
Amin Ahsan Islahi, 93, Pakistani Muslim scholar.
Borislav Mihajlović Mihiz, 75, Serbian writer and literary critic.

16
Lillian Disney, 98, American ink artist and wife of Walt Disney, stroke.
Ralph Fasanella, 84, American painter.
Kim Hak-sun, 73, Korean human rights activist.
Oksana Ivanenko, 91, Soviet and Ukrainian children's writer and translator.
Nicolette Larson, 45, American pop singer, cerebral edema.
David L. McDonald, 91, American admiral, Chief of Naval Operations.
Hu Ning, 81, Chinese physicist and writer.
William A. Smalley, 74, American linguist, heart attack.
Frans Stafleu, 76, Dutch botanist.
Richard Warwick, 52, English actor, AIDS-related complications.

17
Juan Francisco Barraza, 62, Salvadoran football player and manager, cardiac problems.
Paul Bindrim, 77, American psychotherapist.
Ernest Bromley, 85, American minister and civil rights activist.
Katharine Fowler-Billings, 95, American writer, naturalist, and geologist.
Reginald Victor Jones, 86, British physicist and scientific military intelligence expert.
Karl Kainberger, 85, Austrian football (soccer) player.
Marie Gudme Leth, 102, Danish textile printer.
Mel Mazzera, 83, American baseball player.
Uzi Narkiss, 72, Israeli general.
Peter Taylor, 75, English film editor (The Bridge on the River Kwai, Summertime, The Taming of the Shrew), Oscar winner (1958).
Leo Turner, 69, Australian rules football player.
Hanna Walz, 79, German politician.

18
Geoff Campion, 81, British comics artist.
Chris Farley, 33, American comedian and actor (Saturday Night Live, Tommy Boy, Black Sheep), drug overdose.
Harriet Holter, 75, Norwegian social psychologist.
Michel Quoist, 76, French catholic priest, theologian and writer, pancreatic cancer.
George Tsutakawa, 87, American painter and sculptor.

19
Michael Alldredge, 56, American actor (Scarface, Iron Eagle, Shoot the Moon).
Siegfried Barth, 81, German Luftwaffe bomber pilot during World War.
David Bradley, 77, American motion picture director and actor.
Jack Bruen, 48, American basketball coach, cancer.
Bonny Hicks, 29, Singapore model and writer, airplane crash.
Sara Northrup Hollister, 73, American occultist and second wife of author L. Ron Hubbard.
Masaru Ibuka, 89, Japanese electronics industrialist and co-founder of Sony, heart failure.
Patsy Lawlor, 64, Irish businesswoman and politician.
Jimmy Rogers, 73, American blues musician, colon cancer.
David Schramm, 52, American astrophysicist, airplane crash.
Fyodor Simashev, 52, Russian cross-country skier.
Uldis Ģērmanis, 82, Latvian historian, writer and publicist.

20
Jim Gibbons, 73, Irish politician.
Richard Glazar, 77, Czech-Jewish Holocaust survivor, suicide.
Jūzō Itami, 64, Japanese actor, screenwriter and film director, alleged suicide.
Wenceslas Kalibushi, 78, Rwandan catholic bishop.
Denise Levertov, 74, American poet, lymphoma.
Esther Peterson, 91, American consumer and women's advocate.
Dick Spooner, 77, English cricket player.
Dawn Steel, 51, American film studio executive and producer (Cool Runnings, Sister Act 2: Back in the Habit, Honey, I Blew Up the Kid), brain cancer.

21
Joseph Ahrens, 94, German composer and organist.
Roger Barkley, 61, American radio personality, pancreatic cancer.
Blai Bonet, 71, Spanish poet, novelist and art critic.
Johnny Coles, 71, American jazz trumpeter, cancer.
Amie Comeaux, 21, American country music singer, car accident.
Igor Dmitriev, 56, Russian ice hockey player and coach.
Sacco van der Made, 79, Dutch actor.
Jerry Masucci, 63, American attorney and businessman.
Roxbee Cox, Baron Kings Norton, 95, British aeronautical engineer.
Sholom Schwadron, Israeli Haredi rabbi and orator.
Józef Stefański, 89, Polish cyclist.
Bruce Woodcock, 76, English boxer.

22
Sebastian Arcos Bergnes, 66, Cuban human rights activist.
Flea Clifton, 89, American baseball player.
Francis Haar, 89, Hungarian socio-photographer.
José Oliva, 26, Dominican baseball player, traffic accident.
Hal Rice, 73, American baseball player.
Clara Lee Tanner, 92, American anthropologist and art historian.

23
Felix Bwalya, 27, Zambian boxer and Olympian, head injuries sustained in  a boxing fight.
Stanley Cortez, 89, American cinematographer, heart attack.
Les Harrison, American basketball player and coach.
Zaur Kaloyev, 66, Soviet and Georgian football player.
Thomas S. Moorman, 87, United States Air Force officer.
Fred Page, 82, Canadian ice hockey referee and administrator.
Paula Stone, 85, American actress.

24
Fahd Ballan, 64, Syrian druze singer and actor.
Jacques Fabbri, 72, French actor.
Vic Feller, 74, Luxembourgian football player.
Kemper Goodwin, 91, American architect.
Harry Groves, 79, English boxer.
Andy Kerr, 66, Scottish football player.
Charles Roman Koester, 82, American prelate of the Catholic Church.
James Komack, 73, American television producer and writer (The Courtship of Eddie's Father, Chico and the Man, Welcome Back, Kotter), heart failure.
Toshiro Mifune, 77, Japanese actor (Rashomon, Seven Samurai, Throne of Blood), multiple organ failure.
Lotte Motz, 75, Austrian-American scholar.

25
Anatoli Boukreev, 39, Russian and Kazakhstani mountaineer, avalanche.
Anita Conti, 98, French explorer and photographer.
Yvonne Cormeau, 88, British SOE agent during World War II.
Georgi Gavasheli, 50, Soviet/Georgian football player.
Myriam Marbe, 66, Romanian composer and pianist.
Jerry March, 68, American organic chemist.
Paul M. O'Leary, 96, American economist and educator.
Denver Pyle, 77, American actor (The Dukes of Hazzard, Bonnie and Clyde, The Andy Griffith Show), lung cancer.
Kenneth Spring, 76, British Army officer and artist.
Giorgio Strehler, 76, Italian opera and theatre director, heart attack.

26
Cahit Arf, 87, Turkish mathematician.
Cornelius Castoriadis, 75, Greek-French philosopher, social critic and economist, complications following heart surgery.
Simone Duvalier, 84, First Lady of Haiti as wife of François "Papa Doc" Duvalier.
John Hinde, 81, English photographer.
Sergei Mamchur, 25, Russian football player, heart failure.
Victor Oehrn, 90, German U-boat commander during World War II.
Karlis Osis, 80, Latvian-American parapsychologist.
Kenneth Pitzer, 83, American physical and theoretical chemist.
Tommy Price, 86, British speedway rider.
Mircea Veroiu, 56, Romanian film director and screenwriter.

27
Ewart Abner, 74, American record company executive.
Yousef Mohamed Alghoul, 61, Libyan football referee.
Said Brahimi, 66, Algerian-French football player.
Webster Chikabala, Zambian football player and coach, HIV/AIDS.
Brendan Gill, 83, American journalist.
James Nabrit, Jr., 97, American civil rights attorney.
Buxton Orr, 73, British composer and teacher.
Malayattoor Ramakrishnan, 70, Indian writer, cartoonist and lawyer.
Kent Robbins, 50, American country music songwriter, automobile accident.
Bess Whitehead Scott, 107, American journalist.
Tamara Tyshkevich, 66, Soviet shot putter and Olympian.
Danny Wagner, 75, American basketball player.
Billy Wright, 37, Northern Irish paramilitary leader, shot.

28
Heikki A. Alikoski, 85, Finnish astronomer and discoverer of minor planets.
Bill Anderson, 86, American producer, cerebral hemorrhage after falling.
Shaikh Ayaz, 74, Pakistani poet, heart attack.
Corneliu Baba, 91, Romanian painter.
Henry Barraud, 97, French composer.
James Lees-Milne, 89, English writer and expert on country houses.
William Martínez, 69, Uruguayan footballer.
Steve Musseau, 74, American football coach and motivational speaker, heart failure.
Vassily Solomin, 44, Soviet and Russian boxer and Olympian, lung cancer.
Wacław Wójcik, 78, Polish racing cyclist.

29
J. Richardson Dilworth, 81, American businessman.
Helen Kirkpatrick, 88, American war correspondent during World War II.
István Kiss, 70, Hungarian sculptor and politician.
André Marchand, 90, French painter.
Robert Walter Steel, 82, British geographer.

30
Danilo Dolci, 73, Italian social activist, sociologist and poet, heart attack.
Raymond Ericson, 82, American music critic.
Bernard Girard, 79, American screenwriter, producer and film director.
Shinichi Hoshi, 71, Japanese novelist and science fiction writer.
Warren Mehrtens, 77, American thoroughbred horse racing jockey.
Bernard Soysa, 83, Sri Lankan politician.
Kim Sun-ja, South Korean serial killer.
John Howard Yoder, 70, American theologian and ethicist.

31
Jim Chambers, 70, Canadian football player.
Floyd Cramer, 64, American pianist, lung cancer.
Dominique de Menil, 89, French-American art collector and philanthropist.
Billie Dove, 94, American actress, pneumonia.
Richard Elman, 63, American novelist, poet, and journalist.
Michael LeMoyne Kennedy, 39, American lawyer, son of Robert F. Kennedy, skiing accident.
Liu Lantao, 87, Chinese communist revolutionary and politician.
Sandy McPeak, 61, American actor.
Ken Olfson, 60, American actor.

References

1997-12
 12